Andreas Mandelis (born 22 June 1952) is a professor and researcher at the department of Mechanical and Industrial Engineering at the University of Toronto and director of the Center for Advanced Diffusion-Wave and Photoacoustic Technologies (CADIPT). He is an internationally recognized expert in thermophotonics. His research encompasses the non-destructive evaluation of materials with industrial and biomedical applications. He is considered a pioneer in the fields of diffusion-wave, photothermal and photoacoustic sciences and related technologies. He is the inventor of a photothermal imaging radar which can detect tooth decay at an early stage.

Early life and education
Mandelis was born in Corfu, Greece. He received his B.S. in physics from Yale University in 1974. He then pursued graduate studies at Princeton University, where he received a Ph.D. in mechanical and aerospace engineering in 1980 after completing a doctoral dissertation titled "Theory of the frequency and time domain photoacoustic spectroscopy of condensed phases."

Career
After graduating from Princeton, Mandelis worked as a researcher at Bell-Northern Research Labs in Ottawa from 1980 to 1981. He has written and co-authored over 290 papers which have appeared in peer-reviewed journals and about 160 papers in scientific and technical proceedings.

He is the editor-in-chief of the book series "Progress in Photothermal and Photoacoustic Science and Technology" which is published by the Society for Optical Engineering (SPIE). He is the director of the Center for Advanced Diffusion-Wave and Photoacoustic Technologies  (CADIPT) at the University of Toronto, formerly known as Centre for Advanced Diffusion-Wave Technologies (CADIFT). He has appeared as the guest editor in special publications in the area of photoacoustic, photothermal and diffusion-wave phenomena.

He is editor-in-chief of the Springer International Journal of Thermophysics. He is an associate editor for the AIP Journals Review of Scientific Instruments and  the Journal of Applied Physics. He is also a member in the editorial and advisory boards of the SPIE Journal of Biomedical Optics, the Journal of Applied Physics, Applied Physics Letters, the International Journal of NDT&E, Analytical Sciences (J. Chem. Soc. Japan) and the Journal of Diffusion Fundamentals. He is contributing editor for Physics Today of the American Institute of Physics and member of the editorial board for the Journal of Biomedical Optics of the SPIE, in the areas of photothermal imaging, dental optics, and photoacoustic tomography.

Mandelis is a Fellow of the Royal Society of Canada, a Fellow of the American Physical Society, a Fellow of the SPIE, a Fellow of the ASME, Fellow of the Canadian Academy of Engineering,  and a Fellow of the American Association for the Advancement of Science.

He is an internationally recognized expert in applied photonics, imaging, optoelectronics, materials science and biophotonics. He is considered a pioneer in the fields of diffusion-wave, photothermal and photoacoustic sciences and related technologies and his research is recognized as having helped define and develop these areas. He also pioneered the Thermal-Wave Resonant Cavity, which has applications in the fields of  molecular thermophysics, kinetic theory and the infrared emissivity of fluids. Mandelis has created the field of dental photonic engineering and the technique of photocarrier radiometry.

Andreas Mandelis currently works as a full professor at the Department of Mechanical and Industrial Engineering at the University of Toronto which he joined in 1981. He is also a professor at the  Electrical and Computer Engineering department and the Institute of Biomaterials and Biomedical Engineering at the same university. His current research in the field of biomaterials and biomedical engineering involves establishing the fields of biophotonics and biophotoacoustics as they apply to biological tissues.

Quantum Dental Technologies
Mandelis is co-founder and chief technology officer of Quantum Dental Technologies and he is the recipient of the 2012 CAP-INO Medal for Outstanding 
Achievement in Applied Photonics. The company's device, named the 'Canary System', uses laser pulses to detect tooth decay and is used as a non-invasive alternative to traditional methods including x-rays. The machine detects tooth demineralization at an early stage so that the damage can be repaired using remineralizing compounds and avoid the use of drills.

Memberships and awards
Alexander von Humboldt Research Award, Humboldt Foundation, Germany.
Member of K7 (ASME) International Committee on Thermophysics. 
Associate editor, AIP Review of Scientific Instruments. 
2004 New Pioneers Award in Science and Technology, Skills for Change, City of Toronto. 
Founder and Chair of SPIE BiOS (Photonics West) Conference on "Optics in Bone Biology and Diagnostics".
Inaugural (2007) Premier's Discovery Award in Science and Engineering, Ministry of Research and Innovation, Ontario.
Canada Research Chair (Tier 1) in Diffusion-Wave Sciences and Technologies (2008-2015).
2009 Senior Prize of the International Photoacoustic and Photothermal Association. 
2009 Canadian Association of Physicists (CAP) Medal for Outstanding Achievement in Industrial and Applied Physics. 
2009 Yeram S. Touloukian Award in Thermophysics, ASME.  
Killam Research Fellowship.  
2012 Joseph F. Keithley Award For Advances in Measurement Science. Citation:  "For seminal contributions to the development of new experimental techniques based on photothermal science, and the application of these techniques to a variety of real-world problems."
2012 Canadian Association of Physicists (CAP)-INO Medal for Outstanding Achievement in Applied Photonics.
Founder of biennial Mediterranean International Workshop on Photoacoustic & Photothermal Phenomena (Professor Roberto Li Voti, University of Rome, co-founder), Center Ettore Majorana in Erice (Sicily, Italy).
2013 University of Toronto Inventor of the Year Award.
2014 Killam Prize.

Selected publications

List of selected publications:

 Paper selected for inclusion in Virtual Journal of Biological Physics Research (www.vjbio.org), 8 (12) (Dec. 15, 2004).

References

1952 births
Living people
Scientists from Corfu
20th-century Greek physicists
21st-century Canadian physicists
Fellows of the Royal Society of Canada
Fellows of the American Society of Mechanical Engineers
Fellows of the American Physical Society
Fellows of SPIE
Fellows of the Canadian Academy of Engineering
Fellows of the American Association for the Advancement of Science
Academic staff of the University of Toronto
Princeton University alumni
Yale University alumni
Canada Research Chairs
Greek emigrants to Canada